Haranbari Dam, is an earthfill dam on the Mosam River near Satana, Nashik District in the state of Maharashtra in India.

Specifications

Purpose
 Irrigation

See also
 Dams in Maharashtra
 List of reservoirs and dams in India

References

Earth-filled dams
Dams in Nashik district
Dams completed in 1980
1980 establishments in Maharashtra
20th-century architecture in India